There were 3 triathlon events at the 2014 South American Games. The top two in each singles event qualifies for the 2015 Pan American Games in Toronto, Canada.

Medal summary

Medal table

Medalists

References

Results

Triathlon
South American Games
Qualification tournaments for the 2015 Pan American Games
2014